Muntean/Rosenblum is a collaborative artist duo composed of Markus Muntean (born 1962 in Graz, Austria) and Adi Rosenblum (born 1962 in Haifa, Israel). They have been collaborating since 1992.

Background 

Adi Rosenblum and Markus Muntean met each other as students at the Academy of Fine Arts in Vienna, Austria. In 1992 they sublimated their subjective singularity into a double act, into a third person: Mutean/Rosenblum. In 1995 they founded Bricks & Kicks (1995 to 1998), one of the first Artist-Run galleries in Vienna. They were professors for Contextual Painting at the Academy of Fine Arts Vienna from 1999 to 2005 and received the nationally prestigious City of Vienna Prize for Visual Arts in 2001.

Work 

In the compositions of their drawings, the artist couple Markus Muntean and Adi Rosenblum use methods of sampling and resampling of subjects from art history and present-day popular culture. The starting point is an intensive confrontation with the pathos formulas of art history and the questioning of how emotions that find expression as a result are articulated and interpreted in different eras. Motifs that we know from Passion cycles are applied to the psychological dispositions of contemporary existence, sometimes as the expression of an apathy that appeals to the empathy of the beholder. Historically overwhelming pictorial subjects are transferred into the present day, while at the same time triggering a discussion of the media conditions in which pictures are produced today. As a result of the use of language and lettering, a further plane penetrates into the drawings of Muntean and Rosenblum and gives insights into the complexity of the challenges which a subtle medium such as drawing has to face up to today. In the process, Muntean and Rosenblum also take an interest in the aspect of the nomadic narrative. The text collages form, in their relationship with the scenic compositions, aphorisms which pointedly contradict phrases of popular culture, and, through their paradoxical link with figural representations, awaken a dual consciousness.

Solo exhibitions

Collections 
 MoMA, Museum of Modern Art, New York
 Zabludowicz Collection, London, New York
 Susan and Michael Hort, New York
 Ella Fontanals-Cisneros Collection, Miami
 Rubell Family Collection, Miami
 Dicke Collection, Ohio
 The Progressive Art Collection, Ohio
 Burger Collection, Hong Kong
 Belvedere 21er Haus, Vienna, Austria
 Albertina, Vienna, Austria
 EVN Collection, Austria
 Museum of Applied Arts, Vienna (MAK), Vienna, Austria
 MUMOK, Museum of Modern Art Foundation Ludwig Vienna, Vienna
 Essl Museum, Klosterneuburg, Austria
 Museum der Moderne Salzburg, Austria
 Neue Galeri, Graz, Austria
 Bank Austria Kunstforum Wien|Sammlung BA-CA, Vienna
 Galerie für Zeitgenössische Kunst, Leipzig, Germany
 Museum Kunstpalast, Düsseldorf, Germany
 DekaBank Collection, Frankfurt, Germany
 Tel Aviv Museum of Art, Tel Aviv, Israel
 Advaney Collection, The Hague, Netherlands
 MOCAK, Museum of Contemporary Art Krakau, Poland
 Ellipse Foundation, Alcoitčo, Portugal
 MUSAC, Museo de Arte Contemoráneo de Castilla y Léon, Léon, Spain

 ARCO Foundation, Madrid, Spain
 Coleccion Inelcom Arte Contemporaneo, Madrid, Spain
 VAC - Colección Valencia Arte Contemporánea, Valencia, Spain
 Swiss Re Collection, Zurich, Switzerland

Bibliography (selected) 
 Klaus Albrecht Schröder, Elsy Lahner, Albertina Wien (Hgs.): Drawing Now, Hirmer Verlag, Wien/München 2015, 
 Karl-Josef Pazzini (Hg.): Bildung vor Bildern: Kunst - Pädagogik - Psychoanalyse (Theorie Bilden), transcript 2015, 
 Fernando Huici, Gestión Cultural y Comunicación, S.L (Hgs.): Muntean/Rosenblum, The Management of Insignificance, Centro de Arte Contemporáneo Málaga 2013, 
 Essl Museum (Hg.), Muntean/Rosenblum: Between What Was and What Might Be, Essl Museum 2008, 
 Arndt & Partner Berlin/Zurich (Hg.): Muntean/Rosenblum, Kerber Verlag, 2008, 
 Ulf Meyer (Hg.): Double Act. Künstlerpaare, Prestel Verlag, München/Berlin/London/New York 2007, 
 JRP Editions (Hg.): Markus Muntean /Adi Rosenblum – Make Death Listen, JRP Ringier Kunstverlag 2006, 
 De Appel, Adam Szymczyk (Hgs.): Muntean/Rosenblum – To Die For, De Appel Centre for Contemporary Art, Amsterdam 2002, 
 Uta Grosenick, Burkhard Riemschneider (Hgs.): Art now, Taschen Verlag 2002, p. 316–319, 
 Thomas Trummer (Hg.): Das Neue, Österreichische Galerie Belvedere, Wien 2002
 Lóránd Hegyi (Hg.): Aspekte/Positionen: 50 Jahre Kunst in Mitteleuropa 1949–99, Museum Moderner Kunst Stiftung Ludwig, Wien 1999, 
 Secession (Hg.): Muntean/Rosenblum, Secession, Wien 2001, 
 Peter Weiermair, Andreas Hapkemeyer (Hgs.): Figuration, Ursula-Blickle-Stiftung 1999, p. 66–69, 96, 107,

References

External links 
 Official site

Conceptual artists
Israeli installation artists
Art duos
Living people
Israeli contemporary artists
Austrian contemporary artists
1962 births